Alassane Bala Sakandé is a politician and bank executive from Burkina Faso who served as President of the National Assembly of Burkina Faso after death of Salif Diallo and National President of People's Movement for Progress.

References 

Living people
Year of birth missing (living people)
Presidents of the National Assembly of Burkina Faso
People's Movement for Progress politicians